is a village located in Ama District, Aichi Prefecture, in the Tōkai region of Japan. , the town had an estimated population of  4,609  in 1765 households, and a population density of 206 persons per km².

The village contains the place "Aichi-ken Ama-gun Tobishima-mura Ooaza-tobishima Shinden-aza Take-no-gou Yotare Minami-no-wari", which has a claim on having the longest name in Japan.

Geography
Tobishima is situated in south-western Aichi Prefecture, bordered by the metropolis of Nagoya to the east, and Ise Bay to the south. Most of the village is at sea level.

Neighboring municipalities
Aichi Prefecture
Nagoya
Yatomi
Kanie

Demographics
Per Japanese census data, the population of Tobishima has remained steady over the past 70 years.

Climate
The village has a climate characterized by characterized by hot and humid summers, and relatively mild winters (Köppen climate classification Cfa).  The average annual temperature in Tobishima is 15.7 °C. The average annual rainfall is 1651 mm with September as the wettest month. The temperatures are highest on average in August, at around 27.7 °C, and lowest in January, at around 4.6 °C.

History
Tobishima was developed on reclaimed land by the Tokugawa shogunate and again during the Meiji period. The modern village was established on October 1, 1889 with the Meiji period establishment of the modern municipalities system. The village suffered from damage during the 1944 Tōnankai earthquake and the 1959 Isewan typhoon. As a result, an eight-meter tall seawall was constructed to protect the village against storm surges in 1962.

Economy
Tobishima has a mixed agricultural and industrial economy.  The Nishi-Nagoya Thermal Power Station is also located in Tobishima and is a source of tax revenue for the village.

Education
Tobishima has one combined public elementary/middle school operated by the village government. The village does not have a high school.

Transportation

Railway
Tobishima does not have any passenger railway service.

Highways
   Isewangan Expressway – Tobishima IC
 Mei-Nikan Expressway

Sister city relations
 - Rio Vista, California, United States, sister cities since April 6, 2007

References

External links

 

 
Villages in Aichi Prefecture
Populated coastal places in Japan